Panken is a surname. Notable people with the surname include:

Aaron D. Panken (1964–2018), American Reform rabbi and academic administrator
Harold I. Panken (1910–1999), New York state senator
Jacob Panken (1879–1968), American judge and politician
Ted Panken, American writer and journalist